The 1878 Bristol by-election was fought on 14 December 1878.  The byelection was fought due to the resignation of the incumbent Liberal MP, Kirkman Hodgson.  It was won by the Liberal candidate Lewis Fry.

References

1878 in England
1878 elections in the United Kingdom
By-elections to the Parliament of the United Kingdom in Bristol constituencies
19th century in Bristol
December 1878 events